Javadabad (also Romanized as Javādābād; also known as Jām Qolī and Z̧afarābād) is a village in Itivand-e Jonubi Rural District, Kakavand District, Delfan County, Lorestan Province, Iran. At the 2006 census, its population was 83, in 17 families.

References 

Towns and villages in Delfan County